The 1988 All-Ireland Senior Hurling Championship was the 102nd staging of the All-Ireland Senior Hurling Championship, the Gaelic Athletic Association's premier inter-county hurling tournament. The championship began on 22 May 1988 and ended on 4 September 1988.

Galway were the defending champions.

On 4 September 1988, Galway won the championship following a 1-15 to 0-14 defeat of Tipperary in the All-Ireland final. This was their 4th All-Ireland title overall and their second in succession.

Tipperary's Nicky English was the championship's top scorer with 1-22. Galway's Tony Keady was the choice for Hurler of the Year.

Teams

Overview

A total of fifteen teams contested the championship. Twelve of these teams played in the respective Leinster and Munster Championships. Antrim and Galway, who faced no competition in their respective provinces, were given byes to the All-Ireland Championship. London entered the championship at the All-Ireland quarter-final stage as a result of winning the All-Ireland B Championship.

Summaries

Results

Leinster Senior Hurling Championship

Semi-finals

Final

Munster Senior Hurling Championship

First round

Semi-finals

Final

All-Ireland Senior Hurling Championship

Quarter-final

Semi-finals

Final

Championship statistics

Top scorers

Top scorers overall

Top scorers in a single game

Miscellaneous

 The All-Ireland semi-final between Antrim and Tipperary was their first championship meeting since the 1949 All-Ireland semi-final.
 Galway won the All Ireland title as 2nd year running went on sharing in with Meath in the Football Championship.

Bibliography
 Corry, Eoghan, The GAA Book of Lists (Hodder Headline Ireland, 2005).
 Donegan, Des, The Complete Handbook of Gaelic Games (DBA Publications Limited, 2005).

References

1988
All-Ireland Senior Hurling Championship